Muskan Kirar  (born 2001) is an Indian archer. She won the gold medal in the women's compound final event at the Archery Asia Cup, stage-1 competition in Bangkok on 7 March 2018. She beat Malaysian archer Sazatul Nadhirah Zakaria  by 139-136. Muskan was trained by Richpal Singh Salaria at the Madhya Pradesh Archery Academy in Bhopal.

Early life  
Muskan was raised in Jabalpur, Madhya Pradesh. She is the daughter of Mala Kirar, a homemaker, and Virendra Kirar, who is a business man.

Career

Archery Asia Cup 
Kirar’s first match of the tournament saw her amass 142 points against an opponent from Taipei, before winning her next match with a score of 145 points. She won her quarter-final match against an Indonesian opponent, scoring 147 points, before beating a Malaysian competitor in the semi-finals with a score of 148. Kirar’s gold medal came thanks to a win of 139-136 in her final match against Malaysian Zakaria Nadhirah.

Competitions

References

External links 
Proud of Muskan’s gold medal feat in archery, says her father
Muskan Kirar on World Archery Federation
Muskan Kirar on Instagram

Indian female archers
Archery in India
Archery
Archery in Asia
Asian Games medalists in archery
Archers at the 2018 Asian Games
Asian Games silver medalists for India
Medalists at the 2018 Asian Games
Sportspeople from Madhya Pradesh
People from Jabalpur
2001 births
Living people
Competitors at the 2022 World Games
21st-century Indian women